Murihiku is a Māori name describing a region of the South Island in New Zealand. Traditionally it was used to describe the portion of the South Island below the Waitaki River, but now is mostly used to describe the province of Southland. The name means "the tail end (of the land)" (literally muri, the end of; hiku, the tail).

In 1861, when Southland became a province, the settler population wanted to retain the name "Murihiku", but this wish was ignored by the then Governor, Browne. This was "much to the inhabitants' indignation and disgust".

References

Further reading

Southland, New Zealand